This is the discography of the American rapper, Da Brat.

Studio albums

Singles

As lead artist

Featured singles

Music videos

Guest appearances

References

Discographies of American artists
Hip hop discographies